Eric Is Here is a 1967 album billed to Eric Burdon & The Animals, although the actual bands with Burdon are the Benny Golson orchestra and the Horace Ott Orchestra.

History
The album was released in the United States only, by MGM Records, during the gap between the time that the original incarnation of The Animals broke up, and the new incarnation, billed as Eric Burdon & The Animals, was being formed.  The "new" Animals were formed in November 1966, though MGM chose to focus on Eric Is Here during the initial period of the band's formation and performing career, releasing "Help Me Girl" as a single in December 1966, and the album Eric Is Here in March 1967.

Eric Is Here featured Burdon and drummer Barry Jenkins recording the works of various pop songwriters, accompanied by the orchestras of Benny Golson and  Horace Ott, with arrangements by Ott and Golson.  Ott had co-written "Don't Let Me Be Misunderstood", which had been a 1965 hit for The Animals. Golson had previously co-led, with Art Farmer, The Jazztet.  At the time of recording the album, Golson had given up jazz and was concentrating on orchestral work, as well as contributing to the music of various television series.

It is possible that some members of the first incarnation Animals were present during the sessions, or that the record included material previously recorded by the group.

Song backgrounds
"Help Me Girl" reached No. 29 in the US and No. 14 on Decca F12502 in the UK. The Outsiders also had a version of the song, which hit No. 37 in the UK.

"It's Not Easy" was also a No. 95 hit for the pop group The Will O Bees. It was composed by Barry Mann and Cynthia Weil, who co-authored the Animals' earlier hit "We Gotta Get Out of This Place."

"The Biggest Bundle of Them All" was featured on the soundtrack for the movie of the same name, with an alternate version of the song in the film.

"This Side of Goodbye" is the Gerry Goffin and Carole King composition "On This Side of Goodbye", originally recorded by The Righteous Brothers (1966).

Track listing

Side one
"In the Night" (Tommy Boyce, Bobby Hart) 2:28 (Arranged and conducted by Horace Ott)
"Mama Told Me Not to Come" (Randy Newman) 2:15 (Arranged and conducted by Horace Ott)
"I Think It's Gonna Rain Today" (Randy Newman) 2:01 (Arranged and conducted by Benny Golson)
"This Side of Goodbye" (Gerry Goffin, Carole King) 3:24 (Arranged and conducted by Benny Golson)
"That Ain't Where It's At" (Martin Siegel) 2:58 (Arranged and conducted by Horace Ott)
"True Love (Comes Only Once in a Lifetime)" (Bob Haley, Nevel Nader) 2:33 (Arranged and conducted by Benny Golson)

Side two
"Help Me Girl" (Scott English, Larry Weiss) 2:39 (Arranged and conducted by Horace Ott)
"Wait Till Next Year" (Randy Newman) 2:15 (Arranged and conducted by Benny Golson)
"Losin' Control" (Carl D'Errico, Roger Atkins) 2:45 (Arranged and conducted by Benny Golson)
"It's Not Easy" (Barry Mann, Cynthia Weil) 3:07 (Arranged and conducted by Horace Ott)
"The Biggest Bundle of Them All" (Ritchie Cordell, Sol Trimachi) 2:11 (Arranged and conducted by Horace Ott))
"It's Been a Long Time Comin'" (Jimmy Radcliffe, Joey Brooks) 2:42 (Arranged and conducted by Horace Ott)

Personnel
 Eric Burdon - vocals 
 Barry Jenkins - drums
 The Horace Ott and Benny Golson Orchestras

Other Credits
Val Valentin - direction 
 Benny Golson – arranger, conductor
 Horace Ott – arranger, conductor
Nancy Reiner - cover art 
Acy Lehman - cover design 
Bill McMeehan - recording engineer 
Gene Radice - sound mixer

References

Eric Burdon albums
1967 albums
Albums produced by Tom Wilson (record producer)
MGM Records albums
Albums arranged by Benny Golson
Albums conducted by Benny Golson
Albums arranged by Horace Ott
Albums conducted by Horace Ott